Album des pavillons, short for the Album des pavillons nationaux et des marques distinctives, is a flag book published by the French Service hydrographique et océanographique de la marine (SHOM). The contents of the book contain flags, ensigns and standards of countries, including construction sheets and Pantone colors used to reproduce the flags.

References

External links 
 
 Album Des Pavillons Nationaux 1923—1931
 "RESEARCH METHODOLOGY USED for the 2000 EDITION of ALBUM des PAVILLONS", by Commandant Armand du Payrat

Flag literature
Handbooks and manuals